The Flower Pot Gang were an Australian children's entertainment act formed in 1996 by Phillip 'Phil' Barton on guitar and vocals, Rebecca 'Becki' Henry on vocals and Benjamin 'Ben' O'Hara on drums and vocals. Henry left in 1997, replaced by Kristy Gentz. Their albums Happy Little Flower Pots (1997) and Flower Pot Gang (1999) were nominated for the ARIA Award for Best Children's Album in 1998 and 2000, respectively. The group disbanded in 2000. Barton co-wrote the song, "A Woman Like You" (2011), which was recorded by American country music artist, Lee Brice; and "Cowboys Duty" (2015), which was performed by Aron Leigh for the feature film, Sicario.

Members
Phillip Barton – guitar, vocals (1996-2000)
Rebecca Henry – vocals (1996-1997)
Kristy Gentz – vocals (1997-2000)
Benjamin O'Hara – drums, vocals (1996-2000)

Discography

Studio albums
Fun Time! (1996) – ABC Music/EMI (8147612)
Happy Little Flower Pots (1997) – ABC Music/EMI (7243 8 21092 2 8)
Spot in the Park (with Spot) (1999) – ABC Music/EMI (7243 5 21397 2 9)
Flower Pot Gang (1999) – ABC Music/EMI (7243 5 22224 2 1)

Video albums
Under the Flower Pot Rainbow (2000) – ABC Video (102529)

Awards and nominations

APRA Music Awards

ARIA Music Awards

References

External links

Australian children's musical groups
Musical groups established in 1996
Musical groups disestablished in 2000